These are the six National Natural Landmarks in Maryland.

External links
NPS NNL Maryland Webpage

Maryland
National Natural Landmarks